Magna-Fi (known originally The Szuters) was an American rock band, now a solo project by the band's lead vocalist, Mike Szuter. The band's lineup in the 2000s consisted of Mike on guitar and lead vocals, bass guitarist Rob Kley, drummer Charlie Smaldino, and additional guitarist, Christian Brady, as well as CJ Szuter. They are perhaps best known for performing on the Shadow the Hedgehog video game soundtrack, as well as the single "Where Did We Go Wrong", used for the 2005 NASCAR Nextel Cup Series. The band was active from 1996 until 2010, when they split.

In 2020, Mike Szuter decided to revive the project under The Szuters name, releasing the album Sugar that same year, followed by The Devil's in the Details in 2021.

History
Lead vocalist Mike Szuter started the earliest version of the band in Cleveland with his brother and lead guitarist, C.J. (both guitarists and vocalists, had played together since they were 10 and 11 years old), gathering a local following across Ohio performing as Outta The Blue at first then as the Szuters. The band later moved west to Las Vegas and met the other half of the band in Las Vegas. Drummer Charlie Smaldino and  bassist/vocalist Rob Kley had played off and on with each other in Las Vegas, they later changed their name to Magna-Fi. Not immune to the struggles facing any young band, Magna-Fi soon suffered the fallout from a record deal with Gold Circle that went south. The band later signed to EMI Music Marketing-distributed Aezra Records in 2003.

When the Las Vegas-based quartet of hard and heavy alt-rockers known as Magna-Fi opened for Puddle Of Mudd at The Joint at The Hard Rock in late 2003, the Las Vegas Sun called them "the show's chief revelation." The paper added, "The band served up its brand of thunderous music with great energy, sounding more like the future of heavy rock than its past." Influenced by bands ranging from Cheap Trick and the Beatles to Alice In Chains and Failure, Magna-Fi's alt-metal skewed debut album on Aezra/EMI, Burn Out The Stars, was produced by Paul Lani (Megadeth, Failure, Mötley Crüe).

In 2004, Magna-Fi appeared on the weekly concert series in Buffalo, New York, Thursday at the Square along with Fuel and Seven Day Faith. The band at that time for 2 months was direct support for Fuel. In the same year, they appeared on the second stage of the annual festival tour Ozzfest along with Slipknot, Hatebreed, Lamb of God, Atreyu, Bleeding Through, Lacuna Coil, Every Time I Die, Unearth, God Forbid, Otep, Devildriver, Throwdown, Darkest Hour. Afterwards the band headlined their own tour and became direct support for Sevendust for months after. Magna-Fi managed to save the day for a huge returning home for vets show in North Carolina, after a sudden Sevendust cancellation.

At the end of a tour in 2006, they were talking with Aezra about recording the next album, but this conversation ended with the band and the label parting ways, and the band decided to record their next album on their own. This also marked the exit of C.J. Szuter and the entrance of guitarist and vocalist Chris Brady, another Las Vegas native and long time friend of the band. The new album, VerseChorusKillMe, was recorded and mixed by the band itself.

In 2010, Charlie Smaldino the drummer decided that the Vegas lifestyle was enough and because of not playing with the Magna-Fi members for over a year, getting turned down by every record label, and the spark dying, Charlie decided to have one last show at Counts Vamp’d in Las Vegas. The group officially disbanded afterwards.

After trying and trying from 2005–2010 to get another record deal, the band disbanded. Mike Szuter, Rob Kley, and Chris Brady still remain in Las Vegas. CJ Szuter lives outside of Chicago and Charlie Smaldino lives outside of Detroit.

In 2020, Mike Szuter revived the "Szuters" moniker for a solo project and released an album titled Sugar.

Final lineup
Mike Szuter – guitar, vocals (2002-2010)
Charlie Smaldino - drums (2002–2010)
Rob Kley - bass, vocals (2002–2010)
Chris Brady - guitar, vocals (2006-2010)

Past members
C.J. Szuter – guitar (2002–2005) 
John Fedevich – drums
Craig Martini – bass
Ronald DeVault – vocals

Discography
Magna-Fi has released two independent albums, as well as individual tracks for video games.

Burn Out the Stars

Burn Out The Stars is Magna-Fi's debut album, and the only one featuring guitarist C.J. Szuter. Note that this album is not available on streaming services, but can be found on YouTube.

Versechoruskillme

Versechoruskillme is the second and final album by Magna-Fi.

Other songs

Singles
Where Did We Go Wrong
Down In It

Never released songs
These songs were never officially released, though they can be found on YouTube through uploads by fans. 

All The Right Words
American Airtime
Burn Out The Stars
The Curve
Don't Mean Nothing To Me
Ecstatic
Going Out
Hard To Find
Hearts And Minds
Heaven and Flies
Inside The Silence
Kick It Out
Me The Enemy
Misshapen
Obvious
Pay To Play
P.F.I.
Saved The Best For Last
Squint
Stop Me
Wayne (The Handgun Song)

Games
2005: All Hail Shadow – released on Lost & Found: Shadow the Hedgehog Vocal Trax; pure hero story theme song on Shadow the Hedgehog. Another song titled "Who I Am" was originally recorded for the game, but was replaced by "All Hail Shadow" when Aezra prevented the song from being used in the game. The song later appeared on the 2007 album VerseChorusKillMe, but had new leads recorded to replace the original, because C.J. Szuter left the band and was replaced by Chris Brady.
2004: NASCAR SimRacing and NASCAR 2005: Chase for the Cup included the song "Where Did We Go Wrong" as one of the selectable tracks. It is also in the 2005 release of the EA Sports NASCAR Racing arcade game.
2006: All Hail Shadow was covered by Crush 40 for the game Sonic the Hedgehog (also known as Sonic '06 or Sonic Next Gen).

References

External links
Official Magna-Fi Page
Magna-Fi My Space Profile

Video game musicians
Sonic the Hedgehog
Rock music groups from Nevada
Musical groups from Las Vegas